Distoechodon tumirostris is a species of cyprinid in the genus Distoechodon. It inhabits China and Taiwan. Its habitat is inland wetlands and it is used for food.

References

Cyprinidae
Cyprinid fish of Asia
Freshwater fish of China
Freshwater fish of Taiwan